Tamara Kučan (born 22 August 1989) is a Serbian author. Kučan started writing at the age of 16.  Her first novel Beograđanka was published in 2007 by the publishing company ArsLibri. She was admitted to the Association of Writers of Serbia in the year 2010, becoming the youngest member ever admitted. Kučan's writing style is compared to Charles Bukowski.

Bibliography 
 Beogradjanka (“The Belgrade Girl”, a novel ) (ArsLibri, 2007, Urban Art, 2010)
 Made in Beograd (“Made in Belgrade”, a novel ) (Urban Art, 2008)
 Kocka (“The Dice”, a novel ) (Urban Art, 2010) 
 Zauvek (“Forever”, a novel ) (Urban Art, 2012)
 Peščani sat (“Hourglass”, a novel ) (Urban Art, 2013)

References

External links 
Tamara Kučan's homepage

1989 births
Living people
Serbian novelists
Serbian women novelists